The Prohibition of Female Circumcision Act 1985 (c. 38) is a repealed Act of the Parliament of the United Kingdom. It made female genital mutilation a crime throughout the UK, allowing for sentences of up to five years' imprisonment. It was introduced to the House of Lords by Wayland Young, 2nd Baron Kennet, and passed on 16 July 1985, coming into force two months later.

No one was ever successfully prosecuted under the Act, but a medical practitioner was stricken from the Medical Register in 1993 for having performed the procedure. The Act was replaced by the Female Genital Mutilation Act 2003 in England, Wales and Northern Ireland, and the Prohibition of Female Genital Mutilation (Scotland) Act 2005 in Scotland, both of which extend the legislation to cover acts committed by UK nationals outside of the UK's borders, so that it became a crime to take a girl abroad to undergo FGM.

See also
Female genital mutilation in the United Kingdom

References

External links

United Kingdom Acts of Parliament 1985
Female genital mutilation in the United Kingdom
1985 in women's history